Linyanti may refer to:

 Linyanti Combined School
 Linyanti Constituency
 Linyanti River